Iza Orjonikidze (21 November 1938 – 9 February 2010) was a Georgian poet and literary scholar who was also member of the Parliament of Georgia from 1992 to 1995.

Born in Tbilisi, the capital of then-Soviet Georgia, Orjonikidze graduated from the Moscow State University with a degree in philology in 1965. In 1976, she was appointed the director of Leonidze Museum of Georgian Literature, a position she held until 1982 and again from 1989 to 1990 and from 1991 to 2010. In 1989, Orjonikidze was a member of the special commission investigating the actions of the Soviet military against the pro-independence demonstrations in Georgia on 9 April 1989. After Georgia’s independence from the Soviet Union, she was elected to the parliament for Tbilisi's Saburtalo district from 1992 to 1995.

Orjonikidze published several collections of her Poetry and Prose. She received several literary and civic awards, including the Shota Rustaveli State Prize and the Order of Honour. She died after a long illness in Tbilisi at the age of 71.

See also
List of Georgian women writers

References

1938 births
2010 deaths
Burials at Didube Pantheon
Members of the Parliament of Georgia
Women poets from Georgia (country)
Recipients of the Order of Honor (Georgia)
Rustaveli Prize winners
20th-century poets from Georgia (country)
20th-century women writers from Georgia (country)
20th-century writers from Georgia (country)
21st-century writers from Georgia (country)
21st-century women writers from Georgia (country)
20th-century women politicians from Georgia (country)
20th-century politicians from Georgia (country)